Luke Warren Hughes (born September 9, 2003) is an American ice hockey defenseman for the University of Michigan of the National Collegiate Athletic Association (NCAA). He was selected fourth overall by the New Jersey Devils in the 2021 NHL Entry Draft.

Playing career
Hughes committed to play college ice hockey for the University of Michigan during the 2021–22 season. Hughes led the league in goals scored with 13 in conference play, and recorded nine assists for 22 points, the second most points in the league play behind Matty Beniers. He led the nation's defensemen in scoring with 17 goals and 19 assists for 36 points in 37 games and is a +25. He set several Michigan program records this season. His 17 goals surpassed Dean Turner's freshman defenseman record of 13 set in 1975–76, and he passed Jack Johnson's 32 points for the most points by a Michigan freshman defenseman. In March, Hughes recorded one goal and six assists in seven games and was subsequently named the Hockey Commissioner's Association Rookie of the Month. Following an outstanding season, he was named to the All-Big Ten Freshman Team, the All-Big Ten Second Team and was named Co-Big Ten Freshman of the Year. He was also named an AHCA West Second Team All-American.

During the 2022–23 season he led the league's defensemen in scoring with seven goals and 21 assists for 28 points, averaging 1.27 points per game. In 35 total games, he recorded nine goals and 33 assists, ranking second in the nation in points per game by a defensemen. Following an outstanding season he was named a finalist for the Big Ten Player of the Year and Big Ten Defensive Player of the Year and was named to the All-Big Ten First Team.

He was considered a top prospect for the 2021 NHL Entry Draft. On July 23, 2021, Hughes was drafted fourth overall by the New Jersey Devils in the 2021 NHL Entry Draft.

International play

Hughes represented the United States at the 2019 World U-17 Hockey Challenge where he recorded one goal and three assists in six games and won a silver medal.

On May 5, 2022, Hughes was named to the United States men's national ice hockey team to compete at the 2022 IIHF World Championship. He recorded one goal and three assists in ten games. 

On December 12, 2022, Hughes was named to the United States men's national junior ice hockey team to compete at the 2023 World Junior Ice Hockey Championships. During the tournament he served as team captain and recorded four goals and one assist in seven games and won a bronze medal.

Personal life
Hughes comes from an ice hockey-playing family. His father, Jim Hughes, is a former player and team captain for Providence College, an assistant coach for the Boston Bruins, and director of player development for the Toronto Maple Leafs. His mother, Ellen Weinberg-Hughes, played ice hockey, lacrosse, and soccer at the University of New Hampshire and, in 2012, was inducted into the University of New Hampshire Athletics Hall of Fame. She also played for the United States women's national ice hockey team, and won a silver medal at the 1992 World Championship.

Hughes has two older brothers, Quinn, and Jack. Quinn was drafted seventh overall by the Vancouver Canucks in the 2018 NHL Entry Draft, while Jack was drafted first overall by the New Jersey Devils in the 2019 NHL Entry Draft. His mother is Jewish and his father is Catholic.

Career statistics

Regular season and playoffs

International

Awards and honours

References

External links
 

2003 births
Living people
Ice hockey players from Michigan
Jewish American sportspeople
Jewish ice hockey players
Michigan Wolverines men's ice hockey players
National Hockey League first-round draft picks
New Jersey Devils draft picks
People from Canton, Michigan
USA Hockey National Team Development Program players
21st-century American Jews
AHCA Division I men's ice hockey All-Americans